Watchorn is a surname. Notable people with the surname include:

Dan Watchorn, guitarist of Canadian rock band Priestess
Patsy Watchorn (born 1944), Irish folk singer
Peter Watchorn (born 1957), Australian-born harpsichordist
Tara Watchorn (born 1990), Canadian female ice hockey player

English-language surnames